The 1999 Grand Prix of Sonoma was the fourth round of the 1999 American Le Mans Series season.  It took place at Sears Point Raceway, California, on July 25, 1999.

Race results
Class winners in bold.

Statistics
 Pole Position - #42 BMW Motorsport - 1:22.387
 Fastest Lap - #42 BMW Motorsport - 1:23.835
 Distance - 
 Average Speed -

References

Sonoma
Grand Prix of Sonoma